Michele Kim Evans is an American internist and medical oncologist. She is a senior investigator and Deputy Scientific Director at the National Institute on Aging.

Education 
Evans graduated from Barnard College in 1977 with an A.B. degree in biology. She received a medical degree from the University of Medicine and Dentistry of New Jersey-Robert Wood Johnson Medical School in 1981. Evans received postgraduate training in internal medicine at Emory University School of Medicine and fellowship training in medical oncology within the Medicine Branch of the Clinical Oncology Program at the National Cancer Institute.

Career 
Evans is an internist and medical oncologist who was trained as a physician scientist. She conducts epidemiologic clinical research in health disparities and basic bench research on the biology of health disparities. She has investigated the impact of factors including housing insecurity, obesity, and even coffee drinking on health outcomes. Evans and her colleagues argue race is an important social issue affecting patient and public health. She served as a member of the United States Public Health Service Commissioned Corps until 2017, retiring as a captain.

Evans serves as Deputy Scientific Director at National Institute on Aging (NIA) as well as the Training Director for the NIA Intramural Research program. She is a senior investigator of NIA's Laboratory of Epidemiology and Population Science. Dr. Evans has been published in The New England Journal of Medicine, and Molecular and Cellular Biology.

References

Attribution

External links 
 Interview with Evans: "The Impact of Covid-19 on Minority Communities" at New England Journal of Medicine

Living people
Barnard College alumni
University of Medicine and Dentistry of New Jersey alumni
American internists
American oncologists
Women oncologists
21st-century American physicians
21st-century American women physicians
United States Public Health Service Commissioned Corps officers
National Institutes of Health people
21st-century African-American scientists
African-American women physicians
21st-century African-American women
21st-century African-American physicians
Year of birth missing (living people)
Place of birth missing (living people)
Women internists